Battery K, 1st Battalion Tennessee Light Artillery was an artillery battery that served in the Union Army during the American Civil War.

Service
The battalion was organized in Memphis, Nashville, and Knoxville, Tennessee, from June 13, 1863, through October 16, 1863, under the command of Lieutenant Colonel Robert Clay Crawford.

The only record for Battery K notes that it was ordered from Nashville to Knoxville on March 22, 1865.  It was on garrison duty there until July 1865 when the battery was mustered out of the service.

See also

 List of Tennessee Civil War units
 Tennessee in the Civil War

References
 Dyer, Frederick H.  A Compendium of the War of the Rebellion (Des Moines, IA:  Dyer Pub. Co.), 1908.
Attribution

External links
 Brief unit history, including officers' names, regimental strengths, etc.

Military units and formations established in 1863
Military units and formations disestablished in 1865
Units and formations of the Union Army from Tennessee
1865 disestablishments in Tennessee
1863 establishments in Tennessee
Artillery units and formations of the American Civil War